Luigi Visconti, better known by his stage name Fanfulla,  (26 February 1913 – 5 January 1971) was an Italian actor and comedian.

Life and career 
Born in Rome, Visconti debuted at very young age on stage alongside his mother, the actress  Mercedes Menolesi (best known as "Diavolina").

From the mid-forties to the late fifties, he adopted the stage name Fanfulla and was a popular comedian of cabaret and avanspettacolo shows, acclaimed for his brilliant style, referred to as "The King of Avanspettacolo" and even paired with Ettore Petrolini.

His career was relaunched by Federico Fellini, who chose him for the role of Vernacchio in Fellini Satyricon, a role that gave Fanfulla a Nastro d'Argento for best supporting actor. In 1970, Fellini gave him a main role in The Clowns.

In 1971, Fanfulla died from a heart attack in a hotel in Bologna, while he was on tour with his avanspettacolo company.

Partial filmography

Era lui... sì! sì! (1951) - La guardia
Tizio, Caio, Sempronio (1951)
 A Thief in Paradise (1952) - Truffatore
The Piano Tuner Has Arrived (1952) - Adetto militare di Limodia
Canto per te (1953) - Silva
Vacanze a Villa Igea (1954)
Rommel's Treasure (1955) - Muezir
Toto and Marcellino (1958) - Zio Alvaro Merini
Toto, Peppino and the Fanatics (1958) - Giacinti
Toto in Paris (1958) - Il signore del treno
Son of the Red Corsair (1959) - Marquese di Montélimar
World of Miracles (1959)
La Pica sul Pacifico (1959) - Manolo Kivalù
Quanto sei bella Roma (1959)
Il Mattatore (1960) - Sor Annibale
The Dam on the Yellow River (1960)
Death of a Friend (1960) - DeAmicis
Caccia al marito (1960) - The Head Waiter
La banda del buco (1960)
La sceriffa (1960) - Ciccio - Sceriffa's assistant
The Passionate Thief (1960)
The Traffic Policeman (1960) - marito di Amalia (uncredited)
Love in Rome (1960) - Moreno
Rapina al quartiere Ovest (1960)
The Thief of Baghdad (1961) - Abdul
The Joy of Living (1961) - Prison Chaplain
Il carabiniere a cavallo (1961)
Maciste contro Ercole nella valle dei guai (1961)
Caccia all'uomo (1961)
Rocco e le sorelle (1961)
Cacciatori di dote (1961) - Police Commissioner
I magnifici tre (1961) - Pedro
Gerarchi si muore (1961) - Police Inspector Capece
Che femmina!! E... che dollari! (1961)
Roaring Years (1962) - Comico
I tre nemici (1962)
Night Train to Milan (1962) - Il conduttore
Swordsman of Siena (1962)
Destination Rome (1963) - Torquato
La donna degli altri è sempre più bella (1963) - The Manager of the Beach Resort (segment "Bagnino Lover") (uncredited)
Torpedo Bay (1963)
Adultero lui, adultera lei (1963)
The Swindlers (1963) - The Arab merchant (segment "Società calicistica, La")
Follie d'estate (1963) - Passeggero treno
Scandali nudi (1963) - De Roberti
Un marito in condominio (1963)
Siamo tutti pomicioni (1963) - Colonel Siti (segment "Colonnello e signora")
Dark Purpose (1964) - Florist
Una storia di notte (1964) - Barman
Me, Me, Me... and the Others (1966) - Concierge
Omicidio per appuntamento (1967)
Non Pensare a Me (1967)
Fellini Satyricon (1969) - Vernacchio
The Clowns (1970) - Owner of the Varieties Restaurant (final film role)

References

External links 

1913 births
Male actors from Rome
1971 deaths
Italian male stage actors
Nastro d'Argento winners
Italian male film actors
Italian male comedians
20th-century Italian male actors
20th-century Italian comedians
Burials at Campo Verano